Kuh Zardan castle or Ghal'eh Kuh of Zardan is a historical castle located in Zirkuh County in South Khorasan Province, The longevity of this fortress dates back to the Nizari Ismaili state.

References 

Castles in Iran
Castles of the Nizari Ismaili state